Philip Riley Sharp (born July 15, 1942) is an American politician and nonprofit executive who served ten terms in the United States House of Representatives as a Democratic representative from Indiana from 1975 to 1995.

Early life and education
Sharp was born in Baltimore, Maryland, in 1942. He grew up in Elwood, Indiana. After graduating as a valedictorian from Wendell Willkie High School in 1960, he attended DePauw University in 1961. He then transferred and graduated cum laude from the Edmund A. Walsh School of Foreign Service at Georgetown University in 1964.

In 1966, he enrolled in graduate courses at Exeter College, Oxford University in 1966 before returning to Georgetown University to earn his Ph.D. in 1974. Between 1967 and in 1974, he taught political science as an assistant professor, and later associate professor, at Ball State University.

Career 
Between 1964 to 1969, he served as a Legislative Aide to Democratic senator Vance Hartke. His first attempts at elected office came in 1970 and 1972, when he was the Democratic candidate for Indiana's 10th congressional district.

In 1974, Sharp was elected to the House of Representatives as part of the "Watergate Babies" cohort, 47 new Democrats elected in the aftermath of the scandals that drove President Richard Nixon from office.

During his years in Congress, Sharp participated in the passage of major energy legislation. As chairman of the Energy and Power Subcommittee, he played key roles in the 1990 Clean Air Act Amendments and the 1992 Energy Policy Act. He was a member of the National Research Council
Committee on Effectiveness and Impact of Corporate Average Fuel Economy (CAFE) Standards, which issued its major report in 2001. He also chaired the Secretary of Energy's Electric Systems Reliability Task Force, which issued its major report in 1998.

In 1988 and 1990, Sharp defeated future U.S. Vice President Mike Pence. Sharp chose not to seek re-election in the 1994 elections, and was succeeded by Republican David M. McIntosh.

Later years 
Sharp went on to serve as director of the Institute of Politics at Harvard University's John F. Kennedy School of Government. In 2005, he became president of the nonpartisan think tank Resources for the Future in Washington, D.C.

Sharp serves on the board of directors of the Duke Energy Corporation, as vice chair on the board of the Energy Foundation, and as chair of board of ecoAmerica. He is the congressional chair for the National Commission on Energy Policy, is a member of The National Academies’ Committee on America’s Climate Choices and the Blue Ribbon Commission on America's Nuclear Future. Before joining RFF, Sharp was senior policy advisor of the Washington, D.C.-based law and public policy firm Van Ness Feldman.

Honors 
Sharp received honorary degrees from DePauw University in 1986 and Ball State University in 1997. For his work on energy issues while in Congress, Sharp became in 2016 the second recipient of the James R. Schlesinger Medal for Energy Security, an honored given by the U.S. Department of Energy.

References

External links
 
 Phil Sharp at Resources for the Future
 Biography from the John F. Kennedy Jr. Forum
 Philip R. Sharp Papers Archives and Special Collections, Ball State University Libraries (PDF)

1942 births
20th-century American politicians
Living people
Walsh School of Foreign Service alumni
DePauw University alumni
Ball State University faculty
Politicians from Baltimore
Democratic Party members of the United States House of Representatives from Indiana
People from Elwood, Indiana
United States congressional aides
Resources for the Future
Members of Congress who became lobbyists